"Dear Drunk Me" is a song recorded by Canadian country artist Chad Brownlee. The song was co-written by Erik Dylan, Gordie Sampson, and Tawgs Salter. It was the lead single from Brownlee's studio album Back in the Game, and his debut major-label release with Universal Music Canada.

Commercial performance
"Dear Drunk Me" reached a peak of #3 on Billboard Canada Country chart, and marked his first Top 5 hit. It peaked at #90 on the Canadian Hot 100, which made it his first charting entry there since "When the Lights Go Down" in 2014. The song has been certified Gold by Music Canada.

Music video
The official music video for "Dear Drunk Me" premiered on ET Canada on September 12, 2018, and features Brownlee acting in a drunk night filled with poor decisions. It was directed by Ben Knechtel.

Charts

Certifications

References

2014 songs
2014 singles
Chad Brownlee songs
Universal Music Canada singles
Songs written by Gordie Sampson
Songs written by Tawgs Salter
Song recordings produced by Todd Clark